Christian Martínez Cedillo (born 16 October 1979) is a Mexican former professional footballer who played as a goalkeeper. He made a name for himself at the 1999 FIFA U-20 World Cup in Nigeria, when he was the starting goalkeeper for Mexico. He made his México Primera División debut for América in a derby against Guadalajara.

Honours
León
Liga MX: Apertura 2013, Clausura 2014

External links
 
 
 
 
 Christian Martínez at FootballDatabase.com

1979 births
Living people
Club América footballers
C.F. Monterrey players
Footballers from Mexico City
San Luis F.C. players
Association football goalkeepers
Club Puebla players
Indios de Ciudad Juárez footballers
Tecos F.C. footballers
Club León footballers
Liga MX players
Mexico under-20 international footballers
Mexico international footballers
2000 CONCACAF Gold Cup players
Mexican footballers